Museum Town is a 2018 documentary film about Mass MoCA. The film is narrated by Meryl Streep.

References

External links
https://www.imdb.com/title/tt9617464/ 
https://www.museumtownmovie.com/

2018 documentary films